The Saratoga Avenue station is a station on the IRT New Lots Line of the New York City Subway. Located at the intersection of Saratoga Avenue and Livonia Avenue in Brownsville, Brooklyn, it is served by the 3 train at all times except late nights, when the 4 train takes over service. During rush hours, occasional 2, 4 and 5 trains also stop here.

History
The New Lots Line was built as a part of Contract 3 of the Dual Contracts between New York City and the Interborough Rapid Transit Company, including this station. It was built as an elevated line because the ground in this area is right above the water table, and as a result the construction of a subway would have been prohibitively expensive. The first portion of the line between Utica Avenue and Junius Street, including this station, opened on November 22, 1920, with shuttle trains operating over this route. The line was completed to New Lots Avenue on October 16, 1922, with a two-car train running on the northbound track. On October 31, 1924, through service to New Lots Avenue was begun.

From April 11, 2016 until September 19, 2016, Saratoga Avenue and Pennsylvania Avenue were closed for renovation.

Station layout

This elevated station has two side platforms and two tracks with space for a center track that was never installed. Here, they have waist-high black steel fences with two lampposts and one standard black station sign in white lettering in-between them. The windscreens and canopy frames also have black and white station signs.

The station house had several enamel white-on-navy blue "To Street" porcelain signs directing passengers to the street stairs, one of which also had porcelain signs of the same style at the bottom of the canopy that said, "Interborough Rapid Transit Company: To All Trains." These signs were removed during the 2016 renovation.

Exits
The station's only entrance/exit is an elevated station house beneath the tracks at the extreme east (railroad south) end. Inside fare control, it has a waiting area that allows a free transfer between directions, one staircase to the Manhattan-bound platform and two to the New Lots Avenue-bound one. One of those staircases is built adjacent to the platform instead of directly on it and connected to the station house with a wooden elevated passageway. Outside fare control, there is a turnstile bank, token booth, and three staircases going down to all corners of Saratoga and Livonia Avenues except the northeast one.

References

External links 
 
 

IRT New Lots Line stations
Brownsville, Brooklyn
New York City Subway stations in Brooklyn
Railway stations in the United States opened in 1920
1920 establishments in New York City